This page shows the results of the Synchronized Swimming Competition at the 1991 Pan American Games, held from August 2 to August 18, 1991 in Havana, Cuba. There were three medal events.

Solo

Duet

Team

Medal table

References
 Sports 123
 USA Synchro Results

Events at the 1991 Pan American Games
1991
1991 in synchronized swimming